

Events

January
 January 27:  The Nero story De Zwarte Voeten is first published in the newspapers. Halfway the story the main cast member Meneer Pheip makes his debut.
Action Comics (1938 series) #152 - DC Comics
Adventure Comics (1938 series) #160 - DC Comics
Adventures Into the Unknown! (1948 series) #19 - American Comics Group
Adventures of Alan Ladd (1949 series) #9 - DC Comics
Airboy (as Airboy Vol. 7) (1942 series) #12 - Hillman Periodicals
All Star Comics (becomes All Star Western) (1948 series) #58 - DC Comics
Amazing Adventures (1950 series) #2 - Ziff-Davis Publishing Company
Amazing Detective Cases (1950 series) #4 - Atlas Comics
Archie Comics (1946 series) #48 - Archie Publications
Archie's Girls Betty and Veronica (1950 series) #7 - Archie Publications
Archie's Pal Jughead (1949 series) #8 - Archie Publications
Archie's Rival Reggie (1950 series) #2 - Archie Publications
Blackhawk (1944 series) #36 - Quality Comics
The Cisco Kid #2 - Dell Comics
Dale Evans Comics (1948 series) #15 - DC Comics
Danger Trail (1950 series) #4 - DC Comics
Detective Comics (1937 series) #167 - DC Comics
Journey Into Unknown Worlds (1950 series) #38 - Atlas Comics
Movie Town Animial Antics (1946 series) #30 - DC Comics
Mr. District Attorney (1948 series) #19 - DC Comics
Private Eye (1951 series) #1 - Atlas Comics
Sensation Comics (1942 series) #101 - DC Comics
Star Spangled Comics (1941 series) #112 - DC Comics
Strange Adventures (1950 series) #4 - DC Comics
Superboy (1949 series) #12 - DC Comics

February
 February 1: Jean-Michel Charlier and Octave Joly's educational comics series L'Oncle Paul is first published in Spirou.
A-1 Comics (1944 series) #31 - Magazine Enterprises
Action Comics (1938 series) #153 - DC Comics
Adventure Comics (1938 series) #161 - DC Comics
Adventures into Terror (1950 series) #102 - Atlas Comics
Adventures Into the Unknown! (1948 series) #20 - American Comics Group
Adventures of Bob Hope (1950 series) #7 - DC Comics
Airboy (as Airboy Vol. 8) (1942 series) #1 - Hillman Periodicals
All American Western (1948 series) #118 - DC Comics
 All Star Comics (1940 series) #57 - final issue (cover-dated February/March), cancelled by DC Comics
All-True Crime (1948 series) #44 - Atlas Comics
Amazing Adventures (1950 series) #3 - Ziff-Davis Publishing Company
Astonishing (1951 series) #2 - Atlas Comics
Batman (1940 series) #63 - DC Comics
Blackhawk (1944 series) #37 - Quality Comics
Detective Comics (1937 series) #168 - DC Comics
Flash Gordon (1950 series) #4 - Harvey Publications
Journey Into Unknown Worlds (1950 series) #4 - Atlas Comics
Marvel Boy (1950 series) #2 - Altas Comics - Marvel Boy will be renamed to Astonishing
Marvel Tales (1949 series) #102 - Atlas Comics
Men Adventures (1949 series) #6 - Atlas Comics
Star Spangled Comics (1941 series) #113 - DC Comics
Strange Adventures (1950 series) #5 - DC Comics
Superman (1939 series) #68 - DC Comics
White Fang (1944 series) #80 - Classics Illustrated
Young Men (1949 series) #7 - Atlas Comics

March
 March 4: The final episode of Jules Feiffer's gag comic Clifford is published.
 March 5: Malang is sued by the Filipino police for defamation over a cartoon ridiculing them.
 March 12: 
 Hank Ketcham's Dennis the Menace makes its debut.
 David Law's Dennis the Menace and Gnasher makes its debut in The Beano.
 March 13: In Mort Walker's Beetle Bailey Beetle Bailey joins the army, which changes the overall concept of the comic strip, originally premiered in 1950.
 March 16: In Charles M. Schulz' Peanuts Charlie Brown and his friends play their first baseball match.
A-1 Comics (1944 series) #32 - Magazine Enterprises
Action Comics (1938 series) #154 - DC Comics
Adventure Comics (1938 series) #162 - DC Comics
Adventures Into the Unknown! (1948 series) #21 - American Comics Group
Airboy (as Airboy Vol. 8) (1942 series) #2 - Hillman Periodicals
Amazing Detective Cases (1950 series) #5 - Atlas Comics
Archie Comics (1946 series) #49 - Archie Publications
Archie's Girls Betty and Veronica (1950 series) #8 - Archie Publications
Archie's Pal Jughead (1949 series) #9 - Archie Publications
Archie's Rival Reggie (1950 series) #3 - Archie Publications
Battle (1951 series) #1 - Atlas Comics
Blackhawk (1944 series) #38 - Quality Comics
Dale Evans Comics (1948 series) #16 - DC Comics
Danger Trail (1950 series) #5 - DC Comics
Detective Comics (1937 series) #169 - DC Comics
Movie Town Animial Antics (1946 series) #31 - DC Comics
Mr. District Attorney (1948 series) #20 - DC Comics
Mystic (1951 series) #1 - Atlas Comics
Private Eye (1951 series) #2 - Atlas Comics
Sensation Comics (1942 series) #102 - DC Comics
Star Spangled Comics (1941 series) #114 - DC Comics
Strange Adventures (1950 series) #6 - DC Comics
Superboy (1949 series) #13 - DC Comics

April
 April 16: Pom's Piet Pienter en Bert Bibber makes its debut in Het Zondagsblad. 
 April 17: The final issue of the Belgian comics magazine Bravo! is published. 
 April 25: The first issue of the Flemish children's magazine Pum-Pum is published. It will run until 11 January 1967.
 In Osamu Tezuka's Astro Boy story Captain Atom Professor Ochanomizu makes his debut.
A-1 Comics (1944 series) #33 - Magazine Enterprises
Action Comics (1938 series) #155 - DC Comics
Adventure Comics (1938 series) #163 - DC Comics
Adventures into Terror (1950 series) #103 - Atlas Comics
Adventures Into the Unknown! (1948 series) #22 - American Comics Group
Adventures of Bob Hope (1950 series) #8 - DC Comics
Airboy (as Airboy Vol. 8) (1942 series) #3 - Hillman Periodicals
All American Western (1948 series) #119 - DC Comics
All Star Western (previously All Star Comics) (1948 series) #58 - DC Comics
All-True Crime (1948 series) #45 - Atlas Comics
Astonishing (1951 series) #3 - Atlas Comics
Batman (1940 series) #64 - DC Comics
Battle (1951 series) #2 - Atlas Comics
Blackhawk (1944 series) #39 - Quality Comics
Danger Trail (1950 series) #5 - DC Comics
Detective Comics (1937 series) #170 - DC Comics
Flash Gordon (1950 series) #5 - Harvey Publications
Journey Into Unknown Worlds (1950 series) #5 - Atlas Comics
Marvel Tales (1949 series) #103 - Atlas Comics
Men Adventures (1949 series) #7 - Atlas Comics
Mystery in Space (1951 series) #1 - DC Comics
Two-Gun Kid (as Two-Gun Western) (1948 series) #6 - Atlas Comics
Star Spangled Comics (1941 series) #115 - DC Comics
Strange Adventures (1950 series) #7 - DC Comics
Superman (1939 series) #69 - DC Comics
Young Men (1949 series) #8 - Atlas Comics

May
 May: Manuel Vázquez Gallego's La familia Cebolleta makes its debut in the first issue of El DDT.
 May 30: In Charles M. Schulz' Peanuts Schroeder makes his debut, though he will not be depicted playing piano until 24 September.
A-1 Comics (1944 series) #34 - Magazine Enterprises
Action Comics (1938 series) #156 - DC Comics
Adventure Comics (1938 series) #164 - DC Comics
Adventures Into the Unknown! (1948 series) #23 - American Comics Group
Airboy (as Airboy Vol. 8) (1942 series) #4 - Hillman Periodicals
All-Famous Crime (1950 series) #8 - Star Publications
Amazing Detective Cases (1950 series) #6 - Atlas Comics
Archie Comics (1946 series) #50 - Archie Publications
Archie's Girls Betty and Veronica (1950 series) #9 - Archie Publications
Archie's Pal Jughead (1949 series) #10 - Archie Publications
Battle (1951 series) #3 - Atlas Comics
Blackhawk (1944 series) #40 - Quality Comics
The Cisco Kid (1951 series) #1 - Dell Comics
Dale Evans Comics (1948 series) #17 - DC Comics
Detective Comics (1937 series) #171 - DC Comics
Kid Colt Outlaw (1948 series) #14 - Atlas Comics
Movie Town Animial Antics (1946 series) #32 - DC Comics
Mr. District Attorney (1948 series) #21 - DC Comics
Mystic (1951 series) #2 - Atlas Comics
Private Eye (1951 series) #3 - Atlas Comics
Sensation Comics (1942 series) #103 - DC Comics
Star Spangled Comics (1941 series) #116 - DC Comics
Strange Adventures (1950 series) #8 - DC Comics first "gorilla themed" cover featured on a DC comic.
Superboy (1949 series) #14 - DC Comics

June
 June 30: The final issue of the Dutch comics magazine Tom Poes Weekblad, based on Maarten Toonder's Tom Poes, is published.
A-1 Comics (1944 series) #35 - Magazine Enterprises
Action Comics (1938 series) #157 - DC Comics
Adventure Comics (1938 series) #165 - DC Comics
Adventures into Terror (1950 series) #104 - Atlas Comics
Adventures Into the Unknown! (1948 series) #24 - American Comics Group
Adventures of Bob Hope (1950 series) #9 - DC Comics
Airboy (as Airboy Vol. 8) (1942 series) #5 - Hillman Periodicals
All American Western (1948 series) #120 - DC Comics
All Star Western (1948 series) #59 - DC Comics
All-True Crime (1948 series) #46 - Marvel Comics
Astonishing (1951 series) #4 - Atlas Comics
Batman (1940 series) #65 - DC Comics
Battle (1951 series) #4 - Atlas Comics
Blackhawk (1944 series) #41 - Quality Comics
Chamber of Chills (1951 series) #1 - Harvey Comics
The Cisco Kid (1951 series) #2 - Dell Comics
Detective Comics (1937 series) #172 - DC Comics
Journey Into Unknown Worlds (1950 series) #6 - Atlas Comics
Marvel Tales (1949 series) #104 - Atlas Comics
Men Adventures (1949 series) #8 - Atlas Comics
Mystery in Space (1951 series) #2 - DC Comics
PS, The Preventive Maintenance Monthly - Department of the Army
Star Spangled Comics (1941 series) #117 - DC Comics
Strange Adventures (1950 series) #9 - DC Comics
Strange Tales (1951 series) #1 - Atlas Comics
Superman (1939 series) #70 - DC Comics
Two-Gun Kid (as Two-Gun Western) (1948 series) #7 - Atlas Comics
Witches Tales (1951 series) #1 - Harvey Comics
Young Men (1949 series) #9 - Atlas Comics

July
 July 1: EsseGesse's Captain Miki makes its debut. 
 July 26: in Spirou, first strip of Spirou et les Héritiers; Zantafio makes his debut.
A-1 Comics (1944 series) #36 - Magazine Enterprises
Action Comics (1938 series) #158 - DC Comics
Adventure Comics (1938 series) #166 - DC Comics
Adventures Into the Unknown! (1948 series) #25 - American Comics Group
Airboy (as Airboy Vol. 8) (1942 series) #6 - Hillman Periodicals
All-Famous Crime (1950 series) #9 - Star Publications
Amazing Detective Cases (1950 series) #7 - Marvel Comics
Archie Comics (1946 series) #51 - Archie Publications
Archie's Girls Betty and Veronica (1950 series) #10 - Archie Publications
Archie's Pal Jughead (1949 series) #11 - Archie Publications
Battle (1951 series) #5 - Atlas Comics
Blackhawk (1944 series) #42 - Quality Comics
The Cisco Kid (1951 series) #3 - Dell Comics
Dale Evans Comics (1948 series) #18 - DC Comics
Detective Comics (1937 series) #173 - DC Comics
Frontline Combat #1 - (EC Comics)
Kid Colt Outlaw (1948 series) #15 - Atlas Comics
Movie Town Animial Antics (1946 series) #33 - DC Comics
Mr. District Attorney (1948 series) #22 - DC Comics
Mystic (1951 series) #3 - Atlas Comics
Private Eye (1951 series) #4 - Atlas Comics
Sensation Comics (1942 series) #104 - DC Comics
Star Spangled Comics (1941 series) #118 - DC Comics
Strange Adventures (1950 series) #10 - DC Comics
Superboy (1949 series) #15 - DC Comics

August
 August 16: In Charles M. Schulz' Peanuts Lucy van Pelt calls Charlie Brown "a blockhead" for the first time. This will become a running gag in the series.
 August 29: The first issue of the German Disney comics magazine Micky Maus is published.
A-1 Comics (1944 series) #37 - Magazine Enterprises
Action Comics (1938 series) #159 - DC Comics
Adventure Comics (1938 series) #167 - DC Comics
Adventures into Terror (1950 series) #105 - Atlas Comics
Adventures Into the Unknown! (1948 series) #26 - American Comics Group
Adventures of Bob Hope (1950 series) #10 - DC Comics
Airboy (as Airboy Vol. 8) (1942 series) #7 - Hillman Periodicals
All American Western (1948 series) #121 - DC Comics
All Star Western (1948 series) #60 - DC Comics
All-True Crime (1948 series) #47 - Atlas Comics
Astonishing (1951 series) #5 - Atlas Comics
Batman (1940 series) #66 - DC Comics
Battle (1951 series) #6 - Atlas Comics
Blackhawk (1944 series) #43 - Quality Comics
The Cisco Kid (1951 series) #4 - Dell Comics
Detective Comics (1937 series) #174 - DC Comics
Journey Into Unknown Worlds (1950 series) #7 - Atlas Comics
Marvel Tales (1949 series) #105 - Atlas Comics
Men Adventures (1949 series) #9 - Atlas Comics
Mystery in Space (1951 series) #3 - DC Comics
Strange Adventures (1950 series) #11 - DC Comics
Star Spangled Comics (1941 series) #119 - DC Comics
Strange Tales (1951 series) #2 - Atlas Comics
Superman (1939 series) #71 - DC Comics
Two-Gun Kid (as Two-Gun Western) (1948 series) #8 - Atlas Comics
Young Men (1949 series) #10 - Atlas Comics

September
 September 20: In the 701th issue of Spirou Morris publishes the Lucky Luke story Hors La Loi in which the Daltons make their debut.
 September 24: In Charles M. Schulz' Peanuts Schroeder is first seen behind his piano.
 September 26: Willy Vandersteen's comics series Tijl Uilenspiegel debuts in Tintin.
A-1 Comics (1944 series) #38 - Magazine Enterprises
Action Comics (1938 series) #160 - DC Comics
Adventure Comics (1938 series) #168 - DC Comics
Adventures Into the Unknown! (1948 series) #27 - American Comics Group
Airboy (as Airboy Vol. 8) (1942 series) #8 - Hillman Periodicals
Amazing Detective Cases (1950 series) #8 - Atlas Comics
Archie Comics (1946 series) #52 - Archie Publications
Archie's Girls Betty and Veronica (1950 series) #11 - Archie Publications
Archie's Pal Jughead (1949 series) #12 - Archie Publications
Battle (1951 series) #7 - Atlas Comics
Blackhawk (1944 series) #44 - Quality Comics
The Cisco Kid (1951 series) #5 - Dell Comics
Dale Evans Comics (1948 series) #19 - DC Comics
Detective Comics (1937 series) #175 - DC Comics
Kid Colt Outlaw (1948 series) #16 - Atlas Comics
Movie Town Animial Antics (1946 series) #34 - DC Comics
Mr. District Attorney (1948 series) #23 - DC Comics
Mystic (1951 series) #4 - Atlas Comics
Private Eye (1951 series) #5 - Atlas Comics
Sensation Comics (1942 series) #105 - DC Comics
Star Spangled Comics (1941 series) #120 - DC Comics
Strange Adventures (1950 series) #12 - DC Comics
Superboy (1949 series) #16 - DC Comics

October
A-1 Comics (1944 series) #39 - Magazine Enterprises
Action Comics (1938 series) #161 - DC Comics
Adventure Comics (1938 series) #169 - DC Comics
Adventures into Terror (1950 series) #106 - Atlas Comics
Adventures Into the Unknown! (1948 series) #28 - American Comics Group
Adventures of Bob Hope (1950 series) #11 - DC Comics
Airboy (as Airboy Vol. 8) (1942 series) #9 - Hillman Periodicals
All American Western (1948 series) #122 - DC Comics
All Star Western (1940 series) #61 - DC Comics
All-True Crime (1948 series) #48 - Atlas Comics
Astonishing (1951 series) #6 - Atlas Comics
Batman (1940 series) #67 - DC Comics
Battle (1951 series) #8 - Atlas Comics
Blackhawk (1944 series) #45 - Quality Comics
Detective Comics (1937 series) #176 - DC Comics
Journey Into Unknown Worlds (1950 series) #8 - Atlas Comics
Marvel Tales (1949 series) #106 - Atlas Comics
Men Adventures (1949 series) #10 - Atlas Comics
Mystery in Space (1951 series) #4 - DC Comics
Star Spangled Comics (1941 series) #121 - DC Comics
Strange Adventures (1950 series) #13 - DC Comics
Strange Tales (1951 series) #3 - Atlas Comics
Superman (1939 series) #72 - DC Comics
Two-Gun Kid (as Two-Gun Western) (1948 series) #9 - Atlas Comics
Young Men (1949 series) #11 - Atlas Comics

November
 November 2: The first issue of the British comics magazine Girl  is published. It will run until 3 October 1964. 
 November 17: Vilhelm Hansen and Carla Hansen's comic strip Rasmus Klump is first published.
 November: In the Donald Duck story Terror of the Beagle Boys by Carl Barks the Beagle Boys make their debut. The same story also introduces Uncle Scrooge's Money Bin.
A-1 Comics (1944 series) #40 - Magazine Enterprises
Action Comics (1938 series) #162 - DC Comics
Adventure Comics (1938 series) #170 - DC Comics
Adventures Into the Unknown! (1948 series) #29 - American Comics Group
Airboy (as Airboy Vol. 8) (1942 series) #10 - Hillman Periodicals
All-Famous Crime (1950 series) #10 - Star Publications
Amazing Detective Cases (1950 series) #9 - Atlas Comics
Archie Comics (1946 series) #53 - Archie Publications
Archie's Girls Betty and Veronica (1950 series) #12 - Archie Publications
Archie's Pal Jughead (1949 series) #13 - Archie Publications
Battle (1951 series) #9 - Atlas Comics
Blackhawk (1944 series) #46 - Quality Comics
Combat Kelly (1951 series) #1 - Atlas Comics
Dale Evans Comics (1948 series) #20 - DC Comics
Detective Comics (1937 series) #177 - DC Comics
Kid Colt Outlaw (1948 series) #17 - Atlas Comics
Movie Town Animial Antics (1946 series) #35 - DC Comics
Mr. District Attorney (1948 series) #24 - DC Comics
Mystic (1951 series) #5 - Atlas Comics
Police Comics (1951 series) #109 - DC Comics
Private Eye (1951 series) #6 - Atlas Comics
Sensation Comics (1942 series) #106 - DC Comics
Star Spangled Comics (1941 series) #122 - DC Comics
Strange Adventures (1950 series) #14 - DC Comics
Superboy (1949 series) #17 - DC Comics

December
 December 5: The first issue of the Finnish Disney comics magazine Aku Ankka is published. 
 December 28: André Breton, Benjamin Péret and Paul Braig's La Vie Imaginée de Pablo Picasso is launched in the magazine Arts. It's a comic strip about Pablo Picasso and run until 8 February 1952.
 In the 37th issue of Will Eisner and Lou Fine's Doll Man  Doll Man's girlfriend Martha Roberts becomes his team partner under the name Midge, the Doll Girl.
A-1 Comics (1944 series) #41 - Magazine Enterprises
Action Comics (1938 series) #163 - DC Comics
Adventure Comics (1938 series) #171 - DC Comics
Adventures into Terror (1950 series) #107 - Atlas Comics
Adventures Into the Unknown! (1948 series) #30 - American Comics Group
Adventures of Bob Hope (1950 series) #12 - DC Comics
Airboy (as Airboy Vol. 8) (1942 series) #11 - Hillman Periodicals
All American Western (1948 series) #123 - DC Comics
All Star Western (1940 series) #62 - DC Comics
All-True Crime (1948 series) #49 - Atlas Comics
Astonishing (1951 series) #7 - Atlas Comics
Batman (1940 series) #68 - DC Comics
Battle (1951 series) #10 - Atlas Comics
Blackhawk (1944 series) #47 - Quality Comics
Combat Kelly (1951 series) #2 - Atlas Comics
Detective Comics (1937 series) #178 - DC Comics
House of Mystery (1951 series) #1 - DC Comics
Journey Into Unknown Worlds (1950 series) #9 - Atlas Comics
Marvel Tales (1949 series) #107 - Atlas Comics
Men Adventures (1949 series) #11 - Atlas Comics
Mystery in Space (1951 series) #5 - DC Comics
Star Spangled Comics (1941 series) #123 - DC Comics
Strange Adventures (1950 series) #15 - DC Comics
Strange Tales (1951 series) #4 - Atlas Comics
Superman (1939 series) #73 - DC Comics
Two-Gun Kid (as Two-Gun Western) (1948 series) #10 - Atlas Comics
Young Men (1949 series) #12 - Atlas Comics - Renamed to Young Men on the Battlefield

Specific date unknown
 John Gee's The Tindertoes makes its debut. He will draw it until his death in 1977, after which it's continued.
 J.H. Koeleman publishes his first Pinkie Pienter (Ronny Roberts) album.
 Maurice Chénechot draws Riri, which will last until 1953.
 Tom Okamoto's gagcomic Deems first appears in print. It will run in syndication until 1980.
Archie Comics Annual (1946 series) #2 - Archie Publications
Hopalong Cassidy (1946 series) #60 - Quality Comics
King Solomon's Mines - Avon Comics
Rocket To The Moon - Avon Comics

Births

Deaths

January
 January 7: Nelly Bodenheim, Dutch painter, illustrator and comics artist, dies at age 76.

April
 April 5: Harry Hemsley, British comedian, radio presenter, comics artist, voice actor and illustrator (drew for Ally Sloper's Half Holiday, wrote and drew comics based on his own radio show Ovaltiney's Concert Party), passes away at age 73.
 April 7: Gustave-Henri Jossot, French painter, caricaturist, illustrator and comics artist (made early text comics), dies at age 84.
 April 24: Henry Yoshikata Kiyama, Japanese manga artist (The Four Immigrants Manga), dies at the age of 75.

May
 May 21: Clifford McBride, American comics artist (Napoleon and Uncle Elby), dies at the age of 50.

June
 June 10: Dudley Fisher, American comics artist (Right Around Home), passes away at the age of 60 or 61.

July
 July 8: Walter Trier, Czech-German illustrator and comics artist, dies at age 61.

August
 August 14: William Randolph Hearst, American newspaper comics publisher, co-founder of King Features and major force behind the comics industry, passes away at age 88.

September
 September 18: Gelett Burgess, American poet, novelist, illustrator and comics artist (Goops), dies at age 85.

November
 November 8: Antoni Muntañola, Spanish illustrator and comics artist, dies at age 67 or 68.
 November 10: William Meade Prince, American illustrator, theatrical actor and comics artist (Aladdin, Jr.), commits suicide at age 58.

December
 December 2: J.P. Arnot, American comics artist (Helpful Henry), dies at age 64.

Specific date unknown
 Bernard Graddon, British comics artist (Just Jake), dies at the age of 80 or 81.
 George Frederick Kaber, American illustrator (The Adventures of Lovely Lilly), dies at age 90 or 91.

Initial appearances by character name
Tiger Jack, Tex Willer's Indian pard, in The Dalton gang, (January) created by Gian Luigi Bonelli and Galep - Bonelli
Knights of the Galaxy in Mystery in Space #1 (April), created by Robert Kanigher and Carmine Infantino - DC Comics
Kit Willer, Tex Willer's son, in The shadow of fear (May–October)  created by Gian Luigi Bonelli and Galep - Bonelli. In the same adventure, set in Canada, two other recurring characters of the series (the Redcoat Jim Brandon and the trapper Gros-Jean) make their debut.
Captain Comet in Strange Adventures #9 (June), created by Julius Schwartz, John Broome and Carmine Infantino - DC Comics
Pedrito el drito by Antonio Terenghi (Editrice Universo, Italy)

See also
 1950 in comics
 other events of 1951
 1952 in comics
 1950s in comics
 list of years in comics

References

 
1950s comics